Why the Sea Is Salt (the mill that grinds at the bottom of the sea) is a Norwegian fairy tale collected by Peter Christen Asbjørnsen and Jørgen Moe in their Norske Folkeeventyr.  Andrew Lang included it in The Blue Fairy Book (1889).

Synopsis

A poor man begged from his brother on Christmas Eve. The brother promised him, depending on the variant, ham or bacon or a lamb if he would do something. The poor brother promised; the rich one handed over the food and told him to go to Hel (in Lang's version, the Dead Men's Hall; in the Greek, the Devil's dam). Since he promised, he set out.
In the Norse variants, he meets an old man along the way. In some variants, the man begs from him, and he shares with the beggar. However, when the poor man is about to share the meat, the old man tells him that in Hell (or the hall), the dwarves there love that kind of meat but can never get any. The beggar instructs the poor man to barter for the hand-mill behind the door, then return to him for directions to use it. The dwarves offered many fine goods for the meat, but the poor man stubbornly refused to sell the meat until they offered their mill. Going back to the beggar, he tells the poor man that the mill will create whatever he wants, but it will work incesstantly unless the wisher says "good little mill, I thank you enough", which will terminate the process.
In the Greek, he merely brought the lamb and told the devils that he would take whatever they would give him, and they gave him the mill.
He took it to his wife, and had it grind out everything they needed for Christmas, from lights to tablecloth to meat and ale. They ate well and on the third day, they had a great feast. His brother was astounded and when the poor man had drunk too much, or when the poor man's children innocently betrayed the secret, he showed his rich brother the hand-mill.
His brother finally persuaded him to sell it. In the Norse version, the poor brother didn't teach him how to handle it. He set to grind out herrings and broth, but it soon flooded his house. His brother wouldn't take it back until he paid him as much as he paid to have it. In the Greek, the brother set out to Constantinople by ship.
In the Norse, one day a skipper wanted to buy the hand-mill from him, and eventually persuaded him.
In all versions, the new owner took it to sea and set it to grind out salt. It ground out salt until it sank the boat, and then went on grinding in the sea, turning the sea salty.

Analysis
The tale is classified in the Aarne-Thompson-Uther Index type 565, the Magic Mill.  Other tales of this type include The Water Mother and Sweet porridge.

Parallels
It is a late parallel to the Old Norse poem Grottasöngr, found in Snorri Sturluson's Skáldskaparmál.

Variants
Georgios A. Megas collected a Greek variant The Mill in Folktales of Greece.

Japanese scholar Kunio Yanagita listed some variants of The Handmill that Ground out Salt found in Japan, and even remarked that it was part of a group of tales speculated to have been imported into Japan. Fellow scholar Seki Keigo reported 14 variants of the tale type in "Japanese oral tradition". While recognizing that the story appears "widely told in Europe", he also claimed that no version was found in India, and only one in China.

Russian scholarship points out that the tale type is also "very common" among Slavic countries, as well as among Germanic, Celtic and Baltic, which seems to indicate a common shared myth about the nature of the sea. However, according to research Galina Kabakova, the tale type has been collected from the Russian populations of Lithuania and Latvia. Also, the tale type shows a "sporadic" presence in Central Ukraine, apart from "a great number" of variants collected in Lithuania and Latvia.

Variants are also present in Estonia, such as the tale Wie das Wasser im Meer salzig geworden ("How seawater became salty").

Folklorist Wolfram Eberhard stated that the tale type is "found ... particularly in Scandinavia".

References

External links

Why the Sea Is Salt, version by Peter Christen Asbjørnsen and Jørgen Engebretsen Moe

Norwegian fairy tales
The Devil in fairy tales
Hell in popular culture
Salt production
ATU 560-649
Asbjørnsen and Moe